Penelope is the faithful wife of Odysseus in Homer's epic poem Odyssey.

Penelope may also refer to:

People
 Penelope (dryad), a nymph, mother of the god Pan in Greek mythology
 Penelope (given name), any of several people and fictional characters
 Julia Penelope (1941–2013), American linguist, author and philosopher

Places
Penelope, Texas, a town in the United States
Penelope Point, Victoria Land, Antarctica
201 Penelope, an asteroid
Penelope (crater), on Saturn's moon Tethys

Plays
La Penelope, c. 1580, by Giambattista della Porta
Penelope (Maugham play) 1912 by Somerset Maugham
Penelope (Enda Walsh play), a 2010 tragicomedy

Films
Penelope (1966 film), starring Natalie Wood
Penelope (2006 film), starring Christina Ricci

Music
The Penelopes, an indie pop/electronic band from Paris

Opera
Penelope, a German-language opera by Rolf Liebermann
Pénélope, an opera by Gabriel Fauré, first performed in 1913
Pénélope (Piccinni), an opera performed in 1785

Songs
"Penelope" (Pinback song)
"Penelope", a song by Great Big Sea from the album Sea of No Cares
"Penélope", a song by Joan Manuel Serrat
"Pénélope", a song by Georges Brassens 
"Penelope", a song cycle by Sarah Kirkland Snider

Ships
 , any of several Royal Navy ships
Hired armed cutter Penelope, in Royal Navy service from 1794 to 1799
French frigate Pénélope (1806)
, any of several steamships with this name

Other uses
Penelope (bird), a bird genus in the family Cracidae
Penelope (e-mail client), e-mail software now named Eudora OSE
Penelope (horse)  (1798–1824), thoroughbred racehorse and broodmare
Prix Penelope, a thoroughbred horse race in France
Penelope High School, Texas, United States
"Penelope", the name given to Molly Bloom's Soliloquy in the James Joyce novel Ulysses
Penelopeia (plant) , a genus of Cucurbitaceae